Anush Mahalleh (also Romanized as Anūsh Maḩalleh; also known as Anūsh Maḩalleh-ye Avval, Jowkandān-e Avval, and Jūkandān-e Kūchek) is a village in Tula Rud Rural District, in the Central District of Talesh County, Gilan Province, Iran. At the 2006 census, its population was 588, in 131 families.

References 

Populated places in Talesh County